Big Bad World may refer to:

Big Bad World, a 2008 album by Plain White T's
Big Bad World (TV series), a British sitcom on Comedy Central
"Big Bad World", a song on the 2013 album In a Perfect World (Kodaline album)